Maka Botchorishvili (born 15 August 1978) is a Georgian diplomat and politician, Member of Georgian Dream. She is a Member of Parliament of Georgia since 2020.

Biography
 Ministry of Foreign Affairs, Embassy of Georgia to Belgium and the Representation of Georgia to the EU, Envoy Extraordinary and Plenipotentiary (2018 - 2020)
 Charge D’Affaires ad interim (2017 - 2018)
 Ministry of Foreign Affairs, Embassy of Georgia to Austria, the Representation of Georgia to the OSCE, Envoy Extraordinary and Plenipotentiary to * the International Organizations in Vienna (2015 - 2017)
 Ministry of Foreign Affairs, EU Integration Department, Deputy Director (2014 - 2015)
 Ministry of Foreign Affairs, Embassy of Georgia to Belgium, the Representation of Georgia to the EU, Advisor (2010 - 2014)
 Ministry of Foreign Affairs, EU Integration Department, EU-Georgia Relations Division, Head (2009 - 2010)
 Ministry of Foreign Affairs, International Legal Department, I Secretary (2005 - )
 Ministry of Foreign Affairs, Embassy of Georgia to Belgium and the Representation of Georgia to the EU, II Secretary (2005 - 2009)
 Diplomatic Academy of Georgia, Lecturer (2002 - 2005)
 the Representation of Georgia to the EU, Legal Department, Intern, Attaché, II Secretary (1999 - 2004)

References

1978 births
People from Tbilisi
Living people
Georgian Dream politicians
Members of the Parliament of Georgia
21st-century politicians from Georgia (country)